Geosmithia morbida is a species of anamorphic fungus in the Bionectriaceae family that, together with the activity of the walnut twig beetle, causes thousand cankers disease in species of walnut trees (Juglans spp.). It was described as new to science in 2010 from specimens collected in the southern United States. The fungus, transmitted by the walnut twig beetle, Pityophthorus juglandis, is known from the western USA from California to Colorado. The cankers resulting from infection restrict nutrient flow and typically kill the host tree within three to four years. Based on closeness of internal transcribed spacer DNA, the closest relative of G. morbida is G. fassatiae. The specific epithet morbida refers to the deadly pathogenic effect it has on its host.

References

External links

 USDA ARS Fungal Database

Bionectriaceae
morbida
Fungi described in 2010
Fungi of the United States
Fungal tree pathogens and diseases
Nut tree diseases
Fungi without expected TNC conservation status